The 2020 Malaysia Cup (Malay: Piala Malaysia 2020) was the 94th edition of Malaysia Cup tournament organised by Football Association of Malaysia (FAM) and Malaysian Football League (MFL). Winners would qualify directly to 2021 AFC Cup group stage. Since the tournament had been cancelled, the spot was passed down to the third-placed team in the League.

On 12 November 2020, Malaysian Football League (MFL) confirmed that the tournament would not resume and be cancelled immediately. That mean's closes the season for Malaysian football in 2020 following government's rejection of MFL's appeal, including with large parts of the country in Conditional Movement Control Order (CMCO) due to COVID-19 pandemic in Malaysia.

Format 
In the competition, the top eleven teams from the 2020 Malaysia Super League were joined by the top five teams from the 2020 Malaysia Premier League. On 28 October 2020, Sabah FA has been excluded from the competition due to the failure to obtain the National Security Council's permission to leave the state of Sabah, which has been placed under a COVID-19 lockdown.

Recently, the Malaysian Football League (MFL) format for the 2020 Malaysia Cup has been changed following the COVID-19 pandemic that hit the country. Group stage competitions were cancelled and replaced with 16 teams by knockout, including matches in the quarter-finals and semi-finals.  This competition would feature a format change: the round of 16, quarter-finals, semi-finals and final would be played in a single-leg format. The matches were played behind closed doors, though spectators could have been allowed following a review of the situation and the decisions of the national and local government.

Round and draw dates 
The draw for the 2020 Malaysia Cup will be held on 1 November 2020.

Seeding

Knockout stage 

The competition would be played as a mini-tournament style with remaining fixtures to be played as single legged ties. All remaining ties of the competition were played behind closed doors due to the remaining presence of the COVID-19 pandemic in Malaysia.

Key 
• c/d = Cancelled

Bracket

Round of 16

The matches were played from 6 to 8 November 2020.

|}

Quarter-finals

The matches should have played from 12 to 13 November 2020, but it be cancelled immediately by the MFL on 12 November 2020 following government's rejection of MFL's appeal due to COVID-19 Pandemic hit that country.

|}

Semi-finals

The matches were played in 17 November 2020.

|}

Final

The final were played on 22 November 2020 at the Bukit Jalil National Stadium in Kuala Lumpur, Malaysia.

Statistics

Goalscorers 

Players sorted first by goals, then by last name.

Hat-tricks 

Notes
4 Player scored 4 goals

Clean sheets 

Players sorted first by clean sheets, then by last name.

See also
2020 Malaysia FA Cup

Notes

References

External links
Malaysian Football League Official Website - (Malaysia Cup)

2020 in Malaysian football
Malaysia Cup seasons
Malaysia Cup
Malaysia Cup, 2020